Weedon, Northamptonshire on the West Coast Main Line has been the site of two serious derailments in 1915 and 1951, killing 10 and 15 people respectively.

1915 rail crash

On Saturday, 14 August 1915, the 08:45 Birmingham to Euston express passenger train hauled by LNWR George the Fifth Class locomotive No. 1489 lost a taper pin; its purpose was to lock a screwed collar which retained the offside coupling rod to its crank pin. The coupling rod detached and struck one of the sleepers on the up line; pushing the track out of alignment just as the 08:30 Euston to Holyhead Irish Mail train approached. It consisted of 15 coaches hauled by two locomotives 
LNWR Renown Class No. 1971 and Precedent Class No. 1189 and was travelling at 60 miles per hour. Both locomotives and every carriage was derailed; several being thrown down an embankment, killing 10 passengers and injuring 21 more.

1951 rail crash

On Friday, 21 September 1951 the 08:20 Liverpool Lime Street to London Euston passenger service consisting of 15 coaches hauled by a Princess class Stanier Pacific began to de-rail south of Weedon, Northamptonshire, on the West Coast Main Line south of Rugby, at a speed of 65 mph and finally crashed, killing 15 people and injuring 35 more. The footplate crew survived and protected their train in spite of being severely shocked.

The accident enquiry, conducted by Lt Col G R S Wilson, found the track to be in good condition and the speed of the train not to be excessive. However this was the first trip out for the locomotive, No 46207 Princess Arthur of Connaught after its bogie wheelsets had been swapped round. The enquiry concluded that the derailment was caused by an excessively tight bogie axlebox.

References

External links
Ministry of Transport Official Report into 1915 accident
Ministry of Transport Official Report into 1951 accident
Pathe newsreel of 1951 accident

Railway accidents and incidents in Northamptonshire
History of Northamptonshire
Accidents and incidents involving London and North Western Railway
20th century in Northamptonshire
Accidents and incidents involving British Rail
Railway accidents in 1915
Railway accidents in 1951
Derailments in England
1915 disasters in the United Kingdom
1951 disasters in the United Kingdom
August 1915 events
September 1951 events in the United Kingdom